Theodore Shaw Wilson (November 24, 1912 – July 31, 1986) was an American jazz pianist. Described by critic Scott Yanow as "the definitive swing pianist", Wilson had a sophisticated, elegant style. His work was featured on the records of many of the biggest names in jazz, including Louis Armstrong, Lena Horne, Benny Goodman, Billie Holiday, and Ella Fitzgerald. With Goodman, he was one of the first black musicians to appear prominently with white musicians. In addition to his extensive work as a sideman, Wilson also led his own groups and recording sessions from the late 1920s to the 1980s.

Biography 
Wilson was born in Austin, Texas. He studied piano and violin at Tuskegee Institute in Tuskegee, Alabama. After working in Speed Webb's band, with Louis Armstrong, and also understudying Earl Hines in Hines's Grand Terrace Cafe Orchestra, Wilson joined Benny Carter's Chocolate Dandies in 1933. In 1935, he joined the Benny Goodman Trio (which consisted of Goodman, Wilson and drummer Gene Krupa, later expanded to the Benny Goodman Quartet with the addition of Lionel Hampton). The trio performed during the big band's intermissions. By joining the trio, Wilson became one of the first black musicians to perform prominently in a racially integrated group.

Jazz producer and writer John Hammond was instrumental in getting Wilson a contract with Brunswick, starting in 1935, to record hot swing arrangements of the popular songs of the day, with the growing jukebox trade in mind. He recorded hit records with singers such as Lena Horne, Helen Ward and Billie Holiday. During these years, he also took part in many sessions with swing musicians such as Lester Young, Roy Eldridge, Charlie Shavers, Red Norvo, Buck Clayton, and Ben Webster. From 1936 to 1942, he recorded for Brunswick Records and Columbia Records. In the 1950s he recorded on Verve Records.

Wilson formed his own short-lived big band in 1939, then led a sextet at Café Society from 1940 to 1944. He was dubbed the "Marxist Mozart" by Howard "Stretch" Johnson due to his support for left-wing causes: he performed in benefit concerts for The New Masses journal and for Russian War Relief, and he chaired the Artists' Committee to elect Benjamin J. Davis (a New York City council member running on the Communist Party USA ballot line). In the 1950s, Wilson taught at the Juilliard School. Wilson can be seen appearing as himself in the motion pictures Hollywood Hotel (1937) and The Benny Goodman Story (1955). He also worked as music director for the Dick Cavett Show.

Wilson resided in suburban Hillsdale, New Jersey. He was married three times, including to the songwriter Irene Kitchings. He performed as a soloist and with pickup groups until the final years of his life, including leading a trio with his sons Theodore Wilson on bass and Steven Wilson on drums.

In 1979, Wilson was awarded an Honorary Doctorate of Music from Berklee College of Music.

Wilson died of stomach cancer in New Britain, Connecticut, on July 31, 1986, aged 73. He is buried at Fairview Cemetery in New Britain. In addition to Theodore and Steven, Wilson had three more children, William, James (Jim) and Dune.

Select discography

Solo 
1942: Columbia Presents Teddy Wilson
1972: With Billie in Mind (Chiaroscuro)
1983: Alone (Storyville)

As leader 
1944: Teddy Wilson Sextet (The Onyx Club New York Original Live Recordings)
1949: Teddy Wilson Featuring Billie Holiday
1952: Runnin' Wild (MGM)
1952: Just A Mood – Teddy Wilson Quartet Starring Harry James & Red Norvo (Columbia EP B-1569/5-1277)
1955: The Creative Teddy Wilson (Norgran) – also released as For Quiet Lovers (Verve)
1956: Pres and Teddy (Verve) with Lester Young
1956: I Got Rhythm (Verve)
1956: Intimate Listening (Verve)
1956: These Tunes Remind Me of You (Verve)
1957: The Impeccable Mr. Wilson (Verve)
1957: The Teddy Wilson Trio & Gerry Mulligan Quartet with Bob Brookmeyer at Newport (Verve)
1957: The Touch of Teddy Wilson (Verve)
1959: Mr. Wilson and Mr. Gershwin (Columbia)
1959: Gypsy in Jazz (Columbia)
1959: And Then They Wrote... (Columbia)
1963: Teddy Wilson 1964  (Cameo)
1967: Moonglow (Black Lion)
1968: The Noble Art of Teddy Wilson (Metronome)
1973: Runnin' Wild (Black Lion)
1976: Live at Santa Tecla
1980: Teddy Wilson Trio Revisits the Goodman Years
1990: Air Mail Special

As sideman 
1933–1942: Billie Holiday, The Quintessential Billie Holiday (Volumes 1-9); Lady Day: The Complete Billie Holiday on Columbia 1933–1944 (Columbia)
1935: Mildred Bailey, Mildred Bailey and Her Alley Cats (Columbia)
1935–1939: Benny Goodman, The Complete RCA Victor Small Group Recordings (RCA)
1938: Benny Goodman, The Famous 1938 Carnegie Hall Jazz Concert (Columbia)
1946-1947: Sarah Vaughan, The Chronological Classics: Sarah Vaughan 1946–1947 (Classics)
1954: Ben Webster, Music for Loving (Norgran)
1973: Eiji Kitamura, Swing Special
1974: Phoebe Snow Phoebe Snow (album) (Shelter Records)
1975: Eiji Kitamura, Teddy and Eiji- Live Session
1980: Eiji Kitamura, Teddy Wilson Meets Eiji Kitamura

References

External links 

 Teddy Wilson on BlueBlackJazz.com

Teddy Wilson music, papers, and artifacts, Institute of Jazz Studies, (Rutgers University)

1912 births
1986 deaths
Musicians from Austin, Texas
People from Hillsdale, New Jersey
Big band bandleaders
Swing pianists
Mainstream jazz pianists
African-American pianists
American jazz pianists
American male pianists
Tuskegee University alumni
Juilliard School faculty
Brunswick Records artists
Columbia Records artists
Verve Records artists
American jazz educators
Benny Goodman Orchestra members
Musicraft Records artists
20th-century American pianists
Educators from Texas
Educators from New Jersey
Jazz musicians from Texas
20th-century American male musicians
American male jazz musicians
The Chocolate Dandies members
Black Lion Records artists
20th-century African-American musicians